Anthony Williamsen (January 31, 1880 – October 1, 1956) was an American cyclist. He competed in four events at the 1904 Summer Olympics.

References

External links
 

1880 births
1956 deaths
American male cyclists
Olympic cyclists of the United States
Cyclists at the 1904 Summer Olympics
Sportspeople from Milwaukee